Eternal Decision is an American Christian thrash metal band, active since 1994.

Members
Current
Joe Chambless – bass and vocals
Cory Boatright – guitar and vocals
Tommy Torres – guitar
Kirk Campbell – drums
Former
Dave Perkins – vocals
Heath Lawson - guitar

Discography 
Eternal Decision (1997 Cling, Godfather)
Ghost in the Machine (1999 Godfather)
E.D. III (2002, Godfather)
Two Thousand Years of Metallica (2005 compilation, Godfather)

References

External links
 

American Christian metal musical groups
American thrash metal musical groups
Heavy metal musical groups from Oklahoma
Musical groups established in 1996
People from Edmond, Oklahoma
Rock music groups from Oklahoma
Christian rock groups from Oklahoma
Musical groups from Oklahoma